The Greater Bendigo National Park is a national park located in the Loddon Mallee region of Victoria, Australia. The  national park was created in 2002 from the former Whipstick State Park, Kamarooka State Park, One Tree Hill Regional Park, Mandurang State Forest and the Sandhurst State Forest.

Much of the park lies within the Bendigo Box-Ironbark Region Important Bird Area, identified as such by BirdLife International because of its importance for swift parrots and other woodland birds.

See also

 Protected areas of Victoria

References

National parks of Victoria (Australia)
Protected areas established in 2002
2002 establishments in Australia
Important Bird Areas of Victoria (Australia)
Bendigo